Stanley J. Fudro (May 6, 1918 – December 30, 2008) was an American businessman, toy maker, and politician.

Fudro was born in Minneapolis, Minnesota and graduated from Edison High School in 1939. He served in the United States Coast Guard during World War II. Furdo went to the University of St. Thomas and University of Minnesota. Fudro was the owner of the Marla Toy Company and was a toy inventor. He was also a home builder and was involved with the carpenters labor union. Fudro served in the Minnesota House of Representatives from 1957 to 1980 and was a Democratic Party. Fudro died in Anoka, Minnesota.

Notes

1918 births
2008 deaths
Businesspeople from Minneapolis
Politicians from Minneapolis
Military personnel from Minnesota
University of Minnesota alumni
University of St. Thomas (Minnesota) alumni
Toy inventors
Democratic Party members of the Minnesota House of Representatives
20th-century American politicians
20th-century American businesspeople
United States Coast Guard personnel of World War II
Edison High School (Minnesota) alumni